The North Shore State Trail is a multi-use recreational trail in the Arrowhead Region of Minnesota, United States. The  unpaved trail passes through the largely undeveloped backcountry inland from the North Shore of Lake Superior, between the cities of Duluth and Grand Marais. In contrast, the southwestern half of the trail is interrupted by many areas of wetness or standing water. The North Shore State Trail was established by an act of the Minnesota Legislature in 1975.

Description
Some stretches of the trail follow backcountry roads.  The state trail connects with numerous local snowmobile trails.  A  section around Finland is open to all-terrain vehicles.  95% of the land along the trail is public property, so opportunities for camping, fishing, and hunting are abundant.  Trail users can take advantage of 14 overnight shelters with pit toilets, or camp on any public land not posted otherwise.

References

External links
 North Shore State Trail

Protected areas of Cook County, Minnesota
Protected areas of Lake County, Minnesota
Minnesota state trails
Protected areas established in 1975
Protected areas of St. Louis County, Minnesota
1975 establishments in Minnesota